Suzanna Ribalko (born 29 May 1993) is a Latvian footballer who plays as a midfielder. She has been a member of the Latvia women's national team.

References

1993 births
Living people
Latvian women's footballers
Women's association football midfielders
Latvia women's youth international footballers
Latvia women's international footballers